The Doodwala are a Muslim community found in the state of Gujarat in India. Many members of the Doodwala community migrated to Pakistan after independence in 1947 and settled in Karachi, where they are often known as Nagori.

History
The community get their name from the Gujarati word dood, which means "milk". Literally, the word doodwala means "a milk seller". The Doodwala are a sub-division of the Shaikh community and claim their ancestors came from Arabia in the 15th century. They are found mainly in the city of Baroda.

Current status 

The community is strictly endogamous, and consists of a number of lineage groups known as biradaris. Among the larger biradaris are the Hakim, Shaikh, Bhindawala, Makadawala and Koliwala. The Doodwala traditionally marry close kin, and practice both parallel cousin and cross cousin marriages. Their traditional occupation remains milk selling, although many Doodwala are now petty traders. A small number are now wage labourers. Like other Gujarati Muslims, they have a caste association the Doodwala Jamat. This acts both as a welfare association and as an instrument of social control. The Doodwala are Sunni Muslims, with a majority belonging to the Barelvi sub-sect. They are essentially a Gujarati-speaking community, but many Doodwala also now speak Urdu. The Doodwala are one of the more affluent Gujarati Muslim communities, with many members now being successful professionals.

See also

Gujarati Muslims

References 

Social groups of Pakistan
Social groups of Gujarat
Muslim communities of India
Muslim communities of Gujarat